Sarhang Almas Khan, was a Kurdish poet from the village of Kenule in Kermanshah, then under the rule of the Zand dynasty. He is known for writing the Kurdish Shahnameh which until then had been passed down orally. He wrote in Gorani.

Works
 Kurdish Shahnameh
 Gurba wa Mush, Cat and Mouse (poem)

References

People from Kermanshah Province
Kurdish poets
1706 births
1777 deaths
18th-century Kurdish people